

About
The Air Force Aviation Heritage Foundation Inc. was founded in April 2000.  

The Air Force Aviation Heritage Foundation, Inc. is a 501(c)(3) not for profit, volunteer organization dedicated to preserving and displaying as much as is possible of the important role aviation has played in the history of the United States. 

The Air Force Aviation Heritage Foundation is supported primarily through the many sponsors which contribute funds and equipment to the organization.

Current projects
The current projects include obtaining and restoring a Boeing C-22B Restoration Program
static display, and future static displays of vintage Air Force airport fire fighting equipment, among others.

Future projects
The Air Force Aviation Heritage Foundation is working on the roll out of its STEAM program to use flight simulators to teach sciences to middle and high school age children. STEAM is an educational approach to learning that uses Science, Technology, Engineering, the Arts and Mathematics as access points for guiding student inquiry, dialogue, and critical thinking. They are aiming for completion in 2019.

References

External links
National Museum of the United States Air Force

District Of Columbia Air National Guard 201st Airlift Squadron.

Foundations based in the United States